Epsom is  a suburb of the city of Bendigo in central Victoria, Australia. At the 2016 census, Epsom had a population of 4,325.

References

External links

Suburbs of Bendigo
Bendigo